Ormeignies is a village of Wallonia and district of the municipality of Ath, located in the province of Hainaut, Belgium. 

It has an ancient history. Farmers in Neolithic time were settled there, as far back as 4000 BC.

The village church, dedicated to Saint Ursmer and built from stone and brick c.1780, is a good example of neo-classical architecture.

The farm of the Grande Rosière

The Rosiere seigniory belonged to Cambron-Casteau abbey that possessed more than one square kilometres of the village area. The farm of the Grande Rosière was run by monks until the 18th century. Sold as a national asset in 1798 during the French Revolution, it became the property of the prince of Ligne. Cambron-Casteau abbey also possessed the Little Rosière, built in 1755.

The castle of the Rouillé family

The ruins of the former of the Rouillé family is found at the end of the Green Path. The place is haunted by Angélique Pollart d'Hérimez (1756-1840), married to Louis-François de Rouillé, who left us letters evoking splendidly the life in her days in the country of Ath. Destroyed in 1866, the house is reconstructed in the Louis XIII style, according to the plans of  Désiré Limbourg. It is put up for sale in 1834 and shortly thereafter dismantled. History is recalled in the park, designed by the architect Fuchs, where the vestiges of the castle and an old icehouse, Notre-Dame-des-Sept-Douleurs's neo-gothic chapel was renconstructed on the initiative of the local villagers.

External links

ormeignies.net 

Ath
Former municipalities of Hainaut (province)